Sučany is a village and municipality in Martin District in the Žilina Region of northern Slovakia. It is located around 5 km northeast of Martin, in the Váh river valley.

History 
In historical records the village was first mentioned in 1258.

Geography 
The municipality lies at an altitude of 393 metres and covers an area of 33.264 km². It has a population of about 4,644 people.

Notable people

Natives
 ,  (15171558/59), castle captain, Governor of the Hont County, Crown guardian
 ,  (16401688), baroque writer, poet, dramatist, composer of hymns and evangelical Protestant preacher
  (18251849), a volunteer officer, participant in the Revolution of 184849, executed in Körmöcbánya
 ,  (18781944), Slovak politician, statesman and publicist, Prime Minister of Czechoslovakia (1935–1938)
  (18921957), General of the Slovak Army during the Second World War
  (19081985), lawyer and music composer
 (s) Rudolf Petrák (19171972), opera singer (tenor)
  (19201945), editor and Resistance member
   (19211985), novelist and journalist
   (* 1948), architect and development planner
 (s) Martin Ďurík (* 1990), music producer

Active here
  (1737, Szakolca (Skalica)1802), poet, Protestant priest and teacher
  (1819, Raksa (Kisraksa, Rakša)1888), Protestant priest, national cultural worker, and church dignitary
  (1897, Alsókubin (Dolný Kubín)1965), politician and economic worker
  (1903, Mossóc (Moschitz, Mošovce)1979), officer and Resistance member

Twin towns — sister cities

Sučany is twinned with:
 Fulnek, Czech Republic

Gallery

References

External links
 Official website 

Villages and municipalities in Martin District